Broughton is a small village in the western part of the Vale of Glamorgan, southeast Wales. It lies just northeast of Monknash and south of Wick. It contains a building known as "The Malthouse", now converted into flats. The village has extensive remains of a grange of the former Cistercian Neath Abbey including a dove cote and tithe barn.

References

Villages in the Vale of Glamorgan